Fort Wadsworth Light is a 1903 lighthouse built atop Battery Weed on Staten Island in New York Harbor. The light illuminates the Narrows, the entrance to the harbor.  It is located under the Verrazzano-Narrows Bridge.  Fort Wadsworth Light was part of the transfer of Fort Wadsworth from the Navy to the National Park Service in March 1995 as part of Gateway National Recreation Area.

The lantern was possibly moved from Fort Tompkins Light in 1903. When the Verrazzano-Narrows Bridge opened in 1965 the lighthouse became obsolete. Dark for many years, it was restored and converted to solar power by volunteers in 2005.

References

External links
 
 
 National Park Service Historic Lighthouses
 NPS on Fort Wadsworth 
 National Parks of NY Harbor - Fort Wadsworth
 National Park Service - Gateway National Recreation Area

Lighthouses in Staten Island
Lighthouses completed in 1903
Gateway National Recreation Area